Murray High School may refer to:

Australia
Murray High School, Lavington, Lavington, New South Wales

United States
Murray High School (Kentucky) in Murray, Kentucky
Philip Murray High School, Detroit, Michigan, which became Murray-Wright High School
Murray High School (Utah) in Murray, Utah
Murray High School (Virginia) in Charlottesville, Virginia
Murray Junior High School (Minnesota) in Saint Paul, Minnesota